The Philippine Physician Licensure Examination, also called Philippine Medical Boards, is the professional licensure examination for incoming physicians in the Philippines, exclusively administered twice a year by the Professional Regulation Commission.

Admission requirements
According to Article III, Section 9 of the amended Republic Act 2382, also known as the Medical Act of 1959, a board examinee must meet the following qualifications:
is a holder of the degree of Doctor of Medicine or its equivalent, conferred by a college of medicine, duly recognized by the Government;
 completed 1 year of technical training known as internship; 
is a citizen of the Philippines or a citizen of any foreign country who has submitted competent and conclusive documentary evidence, confirmed by the Department of Foreign Affairs showing that his country's existing laws permit citizens of the Philippines to practice medicine under the same rules and regulations governing citizens thereof.
of good moral character (usually with a certificate from the dean of medical school or an immediate superior at work).
has not been convicted by a court of competent jurisdiction of any offense involving moral turpitude.

Boards review programs
After graduating from medical school, candidates who meet all the admission requirements usually enroll in special review classes held from May to July in medical schools, colleges, universities, and review centers.

Program schedule, content, and delivery differs from one review program to another. In these programs, lecturers, called medical board reviewers, are usually full-time professors and part-time professorial lecturers in medical schools and universities.

The review center with the highest number of enrollees is Topnotch Medical Board Prep. Other review centers in the country include Cracking D' Boards, Medprime and Brains Medical Boards Review Center. Only Cracking D' Boards holds review classes both in Cebu and Manila, while Medprime in Baguio.

The Ateneo School of Medicine and Public Health, Ateneo de Zamboanga University, De La Salle University College of Medicine, Fatima College of Medicine, Pamantasan ng Lungsod ng Maynila, University of Santo Tomas, University of the East Ramon Magsaysay Memorial Medical Center, and University of the Philippines offer review classes for their respective graduates.

Coverage
During the entirety of the examination, the following topics are included, pursuant to Section 6:

First Day
 Biochemistry (8:00 AM–10:00 AM)
 Anatomy and Histology (11:00 AM–1:00 PM)
 Microbiology (2:00 PM–4:00 PM)
Second Day
 Physiology(8:00 AM–10:00 AM)
 Legal Medicine, Ethics, and Medical Jurisprudence (11:00 AM–1:00 PM)
 Pathology (2:00 PM–4:00 PM)
Third Day
 Pharmacology and Therapeutics (8:00 AM–10:00 AM)
 Surgery, Ophthalmology, Otolaryngology, and Rhinology (11:00 AM–1:00 PM)
 Internal Medicine (2:00 PM–4:00 PM)
Fourth Day
 Obstetrics and Gynecology (8:00 AM–10:00 AM)
 Pediatrics and Nutrition (11:00 AM–1:00 PM)
 Preventive Medicine and Public Health (2:00 PM–4:00 PM)

Grading System
The twelve subjects are separately graded, with each subject contributing 8.3% to the overall grade. The passing average is 75%, with no grade falling below 50% in any subject. The passing average is obtained using the Mean Passing Level of the entire batch of examinees, which is done using the Nedelsky Method, wherein an examinee's raw scores are transmuted based on the current Mean Passing Level.

List of Topnotchers

List of Top Performing Medical Schools

References

External links
 Philippine physician licensure exam primer by Ezequiel Dimaano MD
 Board Exam Primer by Engr. Jibril Naval Labiao

Medical education in the Philippines